A busybody is someone who meddles in the affairs of others.

The term may also refer to:

Busybody (horse), thoroughbred
Busy Body (album), by Luther Vandross
The Busy-Body (pen name), column in American Weekly Mercury
The Busy Body (film) (1967)
The Busy Body, 1966 novel by Donald E. Westlake
Busy Bodies, 1933 short film starring Laurel and Hardy

See also
The Busie Body, play by Susanna Centlivre